Edwin Bodney is an American slam poet and author of the book A Study of Hands (Not A Cult Press). He is one of the hosts of Da Poetry Lounge. 

Various of Bodney's poems have been featured in Button Poetry. He is the author and performer of the works: "Good Morning: A Story of Flight in the Making", and "When a boy tells you he loves you."

Personal life 
Bodney stated "my work is 101 percent autobiographical." He identifies as queer and is based in Los Angeles. He has a degree from the Fashion Institute of Design & Merchandising.

References 

Living people
Year of birth missing (living people)
American LGBT poets
People from Los Angeles